The Clava cairn is a type of Bronze Age circular chamber tomb cairn, named after the group of three cairns at Balnuaran of Clava, to the east of Inverness in Scotland. There are about 50 cairns of this type in an area round about Inverness. They fall into two sub-types, one typically consisting of a corbelled passage grave with a single burial chamber linked to the entrance by a short passage and covered with a cairn of stones, with the entrances oriented south west towards midwinter sunset. In the other sub-type an annular ring cairn encloses an apparently unroofed area with no formal means of access from the outside. In both sub-types a stone circle surrounds the whole tomb and a kerb often runs around the cairn. The heights of the standing stones vary in height so that the tallest fringe the entrance (oriented south west) and the shortest are directly opposite it.

When Clava-type tombs still contained burial remains, only one or two bodies appear to have been buried in each, and the lack of access to the second sub-type suggests that there was no intention of re-visiting the dead or communally adding future burials as had been the case with Neolithic cairn tombs.

Balnuaran of Clava 

At Balnuaran of Clava itself there is a group of three Bronze Age cairns which lie close together in a line running north east to south west. The tombs at either end are of the passage grave sub-type. The central cairn is of the ring cairn sub-type, and uniquely has stone paths or causeways forming "rays" radiating out from the platform round the kerbs to three of the standing stones. The cairns incorporate cup and ring mark stones, carved before they were built into the structures. The kerb stones are graded in size and selected for colour, so that the stones are larger and redder to the south west, and smaller and whiter to the north east. All these elements seem to have been constructed as one operation and indicate a complex design rather than ad hoc additions.

The ring round the northern Balnuaran of Clava cairn was measured and analysed by Professor Alexander Thom. He found that the ring was slightly egg-shaped with a complex geometry of circles and ellipses which could be set out around a central triangle, using sizes which are close to whole multiples of what he called the Megalithic yard. While the geometry of the shape is generally accepted, the Megalithic Yard is more controversial.

References 

 Scotland Before History – Stuart Piggott, Birlinn Limited (1995), 
 Scotland's Hidden History – Ian Armit, Tempus (in association with Historic Scotland) 1998, 
 Sun, Moon and Standing Stones – John Edwin Wood, Oxford University Press 1978, 

3rd-millennium BC architecture in Scotland
Chambered cairns in Scotland
Archaeological sites in Highland (council area)
Archaeology of death
Bronze Age Scotland
Historic Environment Scotland properties